Uroconger drachi is an eel in the family Congridae (conger/garden eels). It was described by Jacques Blache and Marie-Louise Bauchot in 1976. It is a marine, tropical eel which is known from a single specimen taken from Pointe Noire, Republic of the Congo, in the eastern Atlantic Ocean.

References

Endemic fauna of the Republic of the Congo
Congridae
Taxa named by Jacques Blache
Taxa named by Marie-Louise Bauchot
Fish described in 1976